Eugen Felix (born 27 of April 1836, died 21 of August 1906) was an Austrian painter. He started his studies with Ferdinand Georg Waldmüller and continued in Paris with Léon Cogniet. Felix is particularly well known for his portraits, but he also did historic and mythological scenes.

References
 Felix Eugene. In: Austrian Biographical Encyclopaedia 1815-1950 (ÖBL). Volume 1 Austrian Academy of Sciences, Vienna 1957, p 296

1836 births
1906 deaths
19th-century Austrian painters
19th-century Austrian male artists
Austrian male painters
20th-century Austrian painters
20th-century Austrian male artists